The tornado outbreak of April 17–19, 2019 was a multi-day, widespread severe weather event stretching from the South-Central United States to the East Coast of the United States. On the heels of a significant tornado outbreak just a few days prior, another potent upper-level trough progressed eastward and served as the impetus for widespread, damaging thunderstorms. The outbreak began on April 17 with several short-lived, generally weak tornadoes across Kansas, Oklahoma, and Texas. The following day, a total of 43 tornadoes were recorded across central Mississippi, tying the Hurricane Rita tornado outbreak as the largest in Mississippi state history. On April 19, the event spread eastward. North Carolina recorded 12 tornadoes, the state's sixth largest outbreak in a single day, while Virginia recorded 16 tornadoes, its third-most in a 24-hour period. Overall, 97 tornadoes were confirmed, the strongest of which was a high-end EF3 tornado that heavily damaged or destroyed homes and outbuildings near Rocky Mount, Virginia. There were no fatalities recorded in association with tornadic activity, but four people were killed by trees that were downed by strong straight-line winds.

Meteorological synopsis

April 17
On April 13, the Storm Prediction Center (SPC) outlined a broad swath of the Central United States for the potential for severe thunderstorms four days later. The general threat area was further expanded on April 14, and a heightened risk was introduced from eastern Texas northward into Iowa, indicative of higher confidence of a severe weather outbreak. The next day, a day 3 Enhanced risk was introduced across portions of North Texas, southeastern Oklahoma, and southwestern Arkansas, where supercell thunderstorms capable of producing very large hail were expected. This threat level was maintained going into the event. As a shortwave trough moved into the Central Plains on the afternoon of April 17, strong forcing helped to eliminate the cap across the region. An unstable atmosphere, characterized by mid-level Convective Available Potential Energy (CAPE) values of 1,500–2,500 J/kg, strong wind shear, and very steep mid-level lapse rates of 8.5–9 C/km, led to the formation of discrete supercell thunderstorms along a stationary front across the Texas and Oklahoma panhandles, as well as southern Kansas. Sporadic large hail and landspout tornado reports were received before the storms congealed into a line, transitioning the main severe threat to damaging wind gusts.

April 18
As the SPC introduced a day 5 threat area across the Central United States valid on April 17, the organization also outlined a large day 6 region across portions of the Midwestern states, Mississippi Valley, and Appalachia. A day 3 Slight risk was originally introduced from the central Gulf Coast north into southern Illinois, but a rare mid-afternoon update outlined an Enhanced risk across eastern Louisiana into southern Mississippi. It was later expanded eastward to encompass much of Alabama as well as the Florida Panhandle. In their 16:30 UTC update on April 18, the SPC contemplated upgrading portions of the risk area to a Moderate risk (driven by the chance for tornadoes), but ultimately deferred due to questions surrounding the characteristic of expected storms. As the aforementioned, well-defined shortwave trough progressed eastward into the lower Mississippi Valley, a mesoscale convective vortex organized over west-central Mississippi. Embedded circulations and semi-discrete supercell structures within this complex led to 44 confirmed tornadoes, the strongest of which caused high-end EF2 damage in Morton, Mississippi. This ties the Hurricane Rita tornado outbreak as the largest outbreak in Mississippi state history. As the squall line tracked east, numerous reports of damaging wind gusts were received across the Southeast United States.

April 19
The first indications for organized severe weather on April 19 came six days prior, when the SPC introduced a day 7 threat area from Maryland southward into southern Florida. This outlook was maintained over subsequent days, transitioning to a day 3 Enhanced risk across portions of northeastern South Carolina, eastern North Carolina, and southeastern Virginia on April 17. The next day, the highest risk area was extended southward into Georgia and Florida. By the morning of April 19, a Moderate risk was introduced, stretching from eastern South Carolina into south-central Virginia. Along the leading edge of strong forcing, a severe squall line developed across central Florida northward into southern Virginia, leading to hundreds of damaging wind reports throughout the region. Ahead of this line, multiple long-lived supercells tracked across the Carolinas and into southern Virginia, with others developing as far north as Pennsylvania. Several strong tornadoes touched down within this corridor, where mid-level CAPE reached 1,000 J/kg and low-level wind shear profiles became conducive for tornadoes. Overall, 12 tornadoes touched down in North Carolina, the state's sixth largest outbreak on record in a single day. Meanwhile, 16 tornadoes were confirmed in Virginia, the state's third largest outbreak in a 24-hour period, surpassed only by the Hurricane Ivan tornado outbreak and the 1993 Virginia tornado outbreak. Into the evening, a loss of daytime heating led to a diminishing of the severe weather potential as thunderstorms shifted eastward into the Atlantic Ocean.

Confirmed tornadoes

April 17 event

April 18 event

April 19 event

See also
 List of North American tornadoes and tornado outbreaks
 List of United States tornadoes in April 2019

Notes

References

External links

2019 in Louisiana
2019 in Mississippi
2019 in Florida
2019 in South Carolina
2019 in North Carolina
2019 in Virginia
2019 natural disasters in the United States
April 2019 events in the United States
Tornadoes of 2019